The men's 4 x 400 metres relay event at the 2011 Summer Universiade was held on 20–21 August.

Medalists

* Athletes who competed in heats only and received medals.

Results

Heats
Qualification: First 3 teams of each heat (Q) plus the next 2 fastest (q) qualified for the final.

Final

References
Heat 1 results
Heat 2 results
Final results

Relay
2011